The Ocean is a band that was formed in 2000. It has gone through many different line-ups over the years. Initially, it was called The Ocean Collective because it had a rotating group of members and long-term collaborators, all of whom were centered around the band's guitarist and composer, Robin Staps. However, in 2008, the band changed its name to The Ocean and adopted a more traditional line-up. This included vocalist Mike Pilat, guitarist Jonathan Nido, bassist Louis Jucker, and drummer Luc Hess, in addition to Staps. This line-up was stable until 2009 when Pilat left and was replaced by Loïc Rossetti. This line-up, which included Staps, Rossetti, bassist Mattias Hägerstrand, and drummer Paul Seidel, has been the most stable in the band's history, until the departure of Nido and Hess and the temporary hiatus of Jucker. Currently, the band consists of Staps, Rossetti, Hägerstrand, and Seidel.

Personnel

Current members of The Ocean 
 Robin Staps – guitar, programming, songwriting (2000–present), bass, drums (2002), vocals (2007)
 Loïc Rossetti – lead vocals, clean vocals (2009–present)
 Paul Seidel – drums (2013–present) (also, he has an alter ego named Lady Luap)
 Mattias Hägerstrand – bass (2015–present)
 David Ramis Åhfeldt – guitar (2018–present)
 Peter Voigtmann – synths (2018–present)

Members of The Ocean Collective 
Active members of The Ocean Collective
 Loïc Rossetti – lead vocals, clean vocals (2009–present)
 Robin Staps – guitar, programming (2000–present), bass, drums (2002), vocals (2007)
 Mattias Hägerstrand – bass (2015–present)
 Paul Seidel – drums (2013–present)
 David Ramis Åhlfeldt – guitar (2018–present)
 Peter Voigtmann – keys, synths (2018–present)
 Vincent Membrez – piano, keys (2010–present)
 Dalai Theofilopoulou – cello (2010, 2015–present)

Non-active members of The Ocean Collective
 Nico Webers – lead vocals (2000–2001, 2006–2008), vocals (2005–2006), backing vocals (2004–2005), visuals (2004–2005)
 Markus Gundall – lead vocals (2001–2004)
 Mathias "Meta" Bünte – lead vocals (2004–2006, session 2007–2010)
 Mike Pilat – lead vocals (2007–2009), clean vocals (2008–2009), bass (2007)
 Andreas "Hille" Hillebrand – guitar (2003–2006)
 Matt Beels – guitar (2006–2007, live stand-in 2007–2010)
 Walid Farruque – guitar (2007)
 Jonathan Nido – guitar (2007–2013)
 Damian "Damo" Murdoch – guitar, backing vocals (2013–2017)
 Jonathan "Joni" Heine – bass (2002–2005, 2008 touring)
 Gordon Hünies – bass (2005–2007), percussion (2006–2007)
 Hannes Hüfken – bass (2007–2008)
 Louis Jucker – bass, backing vocals (2008–2013)
 Chris Breuer – bass (2013–2015, 2013 session)
 Jan "Janus" Oberg – drums (2002), vocals (2007 session)
 Torge Liessmann – drums (2002–2007)
 Luc Hess – drums (2008–2013)
 Gerd Kornmann – percussion, backing vocals (2000–2006)
 Yuky Ryang – cello (2005)
 Nils "Der Lünd" Lindenhayn – visuals (2001–2004, 2005–2006)

Touring members of The Ocean Collective
 Peach – vocals (2001)
 Alex Petrovic – vocals (2001)
 Gunter Berlin – guitar (2000–2001)
 Alex Roos – guitar (2002), vocals (2001 session)
 Dirk Wilhelm – guitar (2003)
 Micky Hirschbrich – bass (2000–2002)
 Younès Chraibi – bass (2006–2007)
 Ulf Diehl – drums (2000–2002)
 Craig Murray – visuals (2010–2013)

Session members of The Ocean Collective and other contributors
 Thomas Herold – vocals (2004)
 Tomas Hallbom – vocals (2005–2013 session, 2006 touring)
 Nate Newton – vocals (2005–2007)
 Sean Ingram – vocals (2005)
 Erçüment Kasalar – vocals (2005)
 Carsten Albrecht – vocals (2005)
 Eric Kalsbeek – vocals (2007)
 Jason Emry – vocals (2007)
 Dwid Hellion – vocals (2007)
 Caleb Scofield – vocals (2007)
 René Noçon – clean vocals (2007)
 Sheila Aguinaldo – clean vocals (2010)
 Mitch Hertz – guitar (2010–2013)
 Katharina Selheim – piano (2007)
 Lena Bretschneider – violin (2003)
 Demeter Braun – violin (2004)
 Christoph von der Namer – violin (2007)
 Céline Portat – violin (2010)
 Estelle Beiner – violin (2010)
 Regula Schwab – violin (2013)
 Karina Suslov – viola (2007)
 Isabelle Gottraux – viola (2013)
 Rebekka Mahnke – cello (2003–2004)
 Stephan Heinemeyer – cello (2007)
 Esther Monnat – cello (2010)
 Catherine Vey – cello (2013)
 Lionel Gafner – upright bass (2010)
 John Gürtler – saxophone (2007)
 Jérôme Correa – saxophone (2010)
 Hans Albert Staps – trumpet (2010)
 D. Töne – trombone (2002)
 Robert Gutowski – trombone (2010)
 Tove Langhoff – clarinet (2004)
 Daniel Eichholz – glockenspiel (2007)
 James Yates – vibraphone (2010)
 Jonas Olsson – tambourine (2007)
 Tomas Svensson – samples (2007)

Timeline 
<div align="center">
</div align="center">

Personnel / album chart

Lineups 

Ocean